Jagannathpur is a village in Jharkhand, India. It has a population of nearly 2500.

Near by villages are Parulia and Kumardubi

References

Villages in East Singhbhum district